Redbone is a term historically used in much of the southern United States to denote a multiracial individual or culture. In Louisiana, it also refers to a specific, geographically and ethnically distinct group.

Definition

The term has had various meanings according to locality, mostly implying multiracial people.

In Louisiana, the Redbone cultural group consists mainly of the families of migrants to the state following the Louisiana Purchase in 1803. These individuals may have ancestral ties to the Melungeons. The term "Redbone" became disfavored as it was a pejorative nickname applied by others; however, in the past 30 years, the term has begun to be used as the preferred description for some creole groups, including the Louisiana Redbones.

Louisiana Redbone cultural group
The Louisiana Redbones historically lived in geographically and socially isolated communities in the southwestern Louisiana parishes, ranging from Sabine Parish in the northwest and Rapides Parish near the center of the state down to Calcasieu Parish in the southwest, including parts of Orange County, Texas and Newton County, Texas.  This area is roughly coextensive with what was once known as the Neutral Ground or Sabine Free State, an area of disputed sovereignty from 1806 to 1821 that was primarily bound on the east by the Calcasieu River and the Sabine River on the west.  Most families ancestral to the Louisiana Redbones came from South Carolina (where they were at times classified in some census records as "other free persons"), although some families came from other Southeastern states.  A review of newspaper articles, land grants, census records and other documents referring to the Redbones indicates that the main settlements of Redbones to southwestern and south central Louisiana and southeastern Texas took place over the course of many years, although some members of Redbone families are noted as settling in the Neutral Ground before 1818 when the land was finally and officially considered part of the United States.

The ambiguity of the origins of the members of the Redbone community and the cultural attitudes held by those living in the same region as the Redbone community but who were not part of it is shown in a letter written in 1893 by Albert Rigmaiden, Calcasieu parish treasurer, to McDonald Furman, a South Carolinian who conducted private ethnological research. Rigmaiden wrote that he was unable to explain how the name Redbone originated and stated that

they are neither white nor black & as well as I can find out, the oldest ones came from S.C many years ago ... they are not looked on as being -- Negros -- Indian nor White people.

Historically, members of the Redbone ethnic group lived in three areas. One community lived along Ten Mile Creek in Rapides Parish and Allen Parish. Members of this community were referred to as "Ten Milers" or as "Red Bones." in the 19th century. A second community was along Bearhead creek in what is now Beauregard Parish. A third community was established in Newton County, Texas and Orange County, Texas. 19th century newspapers tended to refer to members of this community simply as "mulattos," and members of the Texas community were not able to vote.

In the frontier of Southwestern Louisiana, the settlers successfully resisted classification as non-white. In 1837 and 1849, several of the members of the Redbone community were indicted for illegal voting on the charge that they were of color rather than white. The state court found them all not guilty, thus establishing that the Redbone community would be legally considered white in the state of Louisiana.

However, references to the Redbone community and its members in 19th century newspapers tend to be wildly divergent, ranging from making no mention of racial makeup, to stating that the members were white, to stating that the members were African American to stating that the members were of Indian extraction to the assertion that the members were of unspecified mixed race.  These newspaper references do have the commonality of all pertaining to violent actions either in the community or perpetrated by members of the community.

Two incidents of violence in Louisiana are particularly notable, one due to the statement of Webster Talma Crawford and one due to amount of newspaper coverage the incident received. The Westport Fight occurred December 24, 1881 in southern Rapides Parish. According to the Crawford account, friction between the more recent settlers and the Redbones had been simmering for much of the month before exploding into a fight that involved several families in the community and ended in the burning down of a store owned by some of the recent non-Redbone settlers. The Bearhead Creek incident took place in what is now southern Beauregard Parish on August 2, 1891. This battle also occurred due to similar tensions between Redbone and more recent, non-Redbone settlers. It left six men dead and several others wounded.

In Texas, one incident of violence is notable. In May 1856 in Orange County, Texas, in the town of Madison (now Orange, Texas), Clark Ashworth was arrested for the theft of a hog.  Ashworth was bound over for trial and his bond was paid by his cousin Sam Ashworth. Sam and a friend met the deputy sheriff Samuel Deputy who had arrested Clark on these charges and challenged him to a gun fight. The deputy sheriff arrested Sam Ashworth on the charges of abusive language from Negroes. Justice of the Peace A. N. Reading ruled that Sam Ashworth was a mulatto and not exclusively black, but neither was he white. Reading then sentenced Ashworth to 30 lashes on the bare back. The sheriff, Edward C. Glover, who was friendly to members of the Redbone community, allowed Sam to escape before sentence could be carried out. Sam Ashworth and his cousin, Jack Bunch, then murdered deputy sheriff Samuel Deputy as he crossed a river with his friend A. C. Merriman. Sheriff Glover organized a posse to hunt for Ashworth but only included Glover's and Ashworth's friends. The posse did not find the wanted men. Thereafter, other attempts were made to find Ashworth and Bunch that were not successful. In the aftermath of this incident, members of the Redbone community in Orange County were harassed; their homes and businesses were burned and plundered. Many living in Orange County moved to Louisiana. Over the coming weeks, a war raged between two groups. Those in support of Glover and the Redbones became known as "regulators" while those who supported Merriman became known as "moderators."

These incidents illustrate the friction between some (mainly new) non-Redbone settlers to the region and the existing Redbone population. It is incidents such as these that may have cemented the non-Redbone view of this population as being both clannish and violent; however, a close reading of the incidents reveals that the tensions causing the fights arose primarily due to the prejudices of the non-Redbone settlers. The census records from the early to late 19th century list many non-Redbone families settling in the same regions as the Redbones, and these settlers, from the evidence of the records, lived peacefully with members of the Redbone families, even, in many cases, marrying into Redbone families.

During the era of mandated racial segregation under Jim Crow laws (ca. 1870s to 1965) schools accepted Redbone students as white and a review of United States Census records in the late 19th and early 20th century shows that families traditionally considered as members of the Redbone community were mainly (although not always) recorded as white.  Additionally, according to the marriage and census records, individuals who were from these families married either other members of the Redbone community or individuals who were listed in the census records as white and not members of the Redbone community.

Academically, the group has been termed "largely unstudied."

In literature
 Campbell, Will D. The Glad River, 1982
 Greg Iles. Natchez Burning, 2014,
James Lee Burke. Morning for Flamingos, 1990

In film
In the film The 6th Man (1997), R.C. St John (played by Michael Michele), in reference to her light colored skin.
In the Netflix series Master of None (2015), Denise (played by Lena Waithe) uses the term to refer to a light skinned black person.
In the television series P-Valley (2020), Autumn Knight (played by Elarica Johnson), in reference to her heritage/ethnicity.

In music 
The American funk rock band Redbone is named after the term as the founding members were all of mixed ancestry.
The 2016 song "Redbone" by Childish Gambino is named after the term.

See also
 Melungeon
 Sabine Free State
 Adams–Onís Treaty
 Regulator–Moderator War
 Brass Ankles
 Métis
 Cajuns
 Acadians
 Mulatto
 Louisiana Creole people
 High yellow

References

External links
 Gilmer, Jason A., Selected Works Free People in a Slave Country,, March, 2010.
 Melungeon Heritage Association
 DeMarce, Virginia. National Genealogical Society Quarterly, March 1992.
 Marler, D. C. Louisiana Redbones, presented at the First Union, a meeting of Melungeons, at Clinch Valley College in Wise, Virginia, July 1997. (anecdotal history)
 Marler, D. C. Redbones of Louisiana, Dogwood Press.
 Crawford, Webster Talma. Redbones in the Neutral Strip or No Man's Land Between Calcasieu and Sabine Rivers, and the Westport Fight Between Whites and Redbones for Possession of this Strip on Christmas Eve, 1882 

Ethnic groups in Louisiana
Multiracial ethnic groups in the United States
African-American history of Louisiana
Louisiana society